is a Japanese voice actor and narrator.

Biography
After attending Tokyo Announce Gakuin Performing Arts College and Mausu Promotion Actor Training Center, he joined Mausu Promotion. He is currently a freelancer.

Among his many roles, he voiced Shichika Yasuri in Katanagatari, Kuranosuke Shiraishi in The Prince of Tennis, Kojou Akatsuki in Strike the Blood, IV in Yu-Gi-Oh! Zexal, Reiner Braun in Attack on Titan, Saburō Katō in Star Blazers: Space Battleship Yamato 2199, Junpei Hyūga in Kuroko's Basketball, Sentarō Kawabuchi in Kids on the Slope, Haruhiro in Grimgar of Fantasy and Ash, Daryun in The Heroic Legend of Arslan, Orga Itsuka in Mobile Suit Gundam: Iron-Blooded Orphans, Akari Hizamaru in Terra Formars, Doppo Kunikida in Bungo Stray Dogs, Asahi Azumane in Haikyuu!!, Fumikage Tokoyami in My Hero Academia, Nagare Akiba in Ushio and Tora, John H. Watson in The Empire of Corpses, Aren Kuboyasu in The Disastrous Life of Saiki K., Genjirō Tanigaki in Golden Kamuy, Joe in Megalobox, Houjou Shūsaku in In This Corner of the World,  Ausukai Jin in Boogiepop and Others, Kanata Hoshijima in Astra Lost in Space, Shin in Dorohedoro and Belial in Granblue Fantasy.

Hosoya won the awards at the 8th Seiyu Awards and 10th Seiyu Awards for best supporting actor. On April 23, 2017, he went for a treatment for his throat. He resumed his career on August 4, 2017.

Filmography

Anime series

Original video animation

Original net animation

Anime films

Video games

Audio drama

Vomic

Narration

Voice over & TVCM

Recitation

Radio drama

Tokusatsu

Live action

Dubbing

Live-action

Animation

Radio & Variety

Discography

Character song

Max Boys
Single

Album

Awards and prizes

References

External links
  
 Yoshimasa Hosoya at GamePlaza-Haruka Voice Acting Database 
 Yoshimasa Hosoya at Hitoshi Doi's Seiyuu Database
 
 

1982 births
Living people
Japanese male video game actors
Japanese male voice actors
Male voice actors from Hiroshima
Male voice actors from Hiroshima Prefecture
Mausu Promotion voice actors
People from Onomichi, Hiroshima
Seiyu Award winners
21st-century Japanese male actors
21st-century Japanese singers
21st-century Japanese male singers